Greuel is a surname of German origin. Notable people with the surname include:

Dick Greuel (1928–2013), American radio personality, businessman and politician
Wendy Greuel (born 1961), American politician
Marcelo Greuel, Cyclist

References

Surnames of German origin